Combat Dress was the name of the uniform worn by members of Land Force Command of the Canadian Forces from 1968 to 2002.

The combat uniform was Sky blue-drab colour pants and shirt replacing the old Battle Dress from the British. This pattern was adopted by NATO members in the 1960s, but abandoned for camouflage and disruptive patterns by all but Canada. Development of CADPAT started in the 1990s, but it was not until the turn of the 21st century that widespread adoption began. The Royal Canadian Army Cadets and the Royal Canadian Air Cadets adopted the combat dress for field use and it is also worn by civilian instructors for the cadets.

For more on combat dress go to CF Operational Dress.

Components

 Sky blue T-Shirt
 combat shirt (tunic)
 combat cargo pant
 bucket hat
 combat dresses
 combat jacket (with detachable liner)
 Arctic Jacket (with detachable liner)

The basic combat clothing was a flocked cotton over nylon. There are many different variations on the Canadian combat shirt (tunic); one was a simple button up with FN magazine type pockets, another made of a heavier material (for cold weather) and had a zipper in place of buttons with the same pocket style but without dividers for FNC1A1 magazines, and the cadet combats that was made of a lighter material then to both and had different pockets arrangement and size as well as no draw strings. The combat jacket was of heavy cotton while the arctic jacket had a nylon shell.  Both the combat shirt and the jackets had two lower cargo pockets with inserts that could hold 3 FNC1A1 20 round magazines each.  The upper 2 pockets were angled inward and could hold 1 FNC1A1 magazine each. The combat shirts also have one inner pocket that was held closed by velcro and was clearly visible by an outline of thread on the outer right side of the shirt. Both the jackets and combat shirts have draw strings on the bottom and in the middle of the shirt, these were there to prevent debris and winds from entering the shirt as well as to prevent billowing during para jumping. Combat pants have buttons on every belt loop, this was if the pants were to large you could button over to the next button to make them smaller. Combat pants also had "blousers" which were tucked into the boots and the draw string on the bottom of the pant leg will be tightened around the top of the boot to keep out foreign objects and pests. Often the "blousers" were ripped out of the pant leg and used as toilet paper.

See also

 CADPAT
 Prototype J

Canadian military uniforms